Kalaveh may refer to:
 Kalaveh, Ravansar
 Kalaveh-ye Heydar Khan, Ravansar County
 Kalaveh, Sarpol-e Zahab